Institut de N'Djili, formerly known as "Bio-Chimie de N'Djili" in French, is a secondary school in Kinshasa, the Democratic Republic of the Congo. It is located on Commercial Avenue in the town of N'Djili. The school focuses on biology, chemistry, mathematics, physics, and liberal studies.

References

External links

Schools in Kinshasa
Schools in the Democratic Republic of the Congo